Washington's 21st legislative district is one of forty-nine districts in Washington state for representation in the state legislature.

The district is in southwest Snohomish County, including all or part of Edmonds, Lynnwood, and Mukilteo.

This mostly suburban district is represented by state senator Marko Liias and state representatives Strom Peterson (position 1) and Lillian Ortiz-Self (position 2), all Democrats. 

The state senate position was vacated on January 7, 2014, by Paull Shin (D).

See also
Washington Redistricting Commission
Washington State Legislature
Washington State Senate
Washington House of Representatives
Washington (state) legislative districts

References

External links
Washington State Redistricting Commission
Washington House of Representatives
Map of Legislative Districts

21